The Gallaudet PW-4 was a prototype biplane fighter aircraft built by the Gallaudet Aircraft Company. It was one of the last projects by the company before it was taken over by Consolidated Aircraft. It was all-metal and powered by a Packard 11A-1237 engine. Three prototypes were ordered by the USAAC, but the company could afford to build only one, which never flew.

Specifications

References

Bibliography

1920s United States fighter aircraft